Season 1892–93 was the 20th season of competitive football by Kilmarnock.

Overview
For the second consecutive season, Kilmarnock competed in the Scottish Football Alliance and finished seventh out of 10 teams. They reached the second round of the Scottish Cup after a 2–1 win against to Albion Rovers at Meadow Park but were eliminated in the second round by Queen's Park.

Kilmarnock also suffered a second round defeat in the Ayrshire Cup. After receiving a bye in the first round, they lost 5–4 to Ayr Parkhouse. Killie's defence of the Kilmarnock Merchants' Charity Cup ended at the final hurdle as they lost 5–2 to Annbank in the final.

Scottish Alliance

Notes

Scottish Cup

Ayrshire Cup

Kilmarnock Merchants' Charity Cup

Notes

References

1892–93
1892–93 in Scottish football
Scottish football clubs 1892–93 season